William Joseph Croke (1840 – March 11, 1869) was a Nova Scotia lawyer and political figure. He represented Richmond in the House of Commons of Canada as a member of the Anti-Confederation Party from 1867 to 1869.

Croke practised law in Arichat, Nova Scotia. He died in office at Halifax in 1869 at the age of 29.

References 

1840 births
1869 deaths
Members of the House of Commons of Canada from Nova Scotia
Anti-Confederation Party MPs